Sridhar Lagadapati (born 14 June 1968) is the founder and head of Sirisuns Entertainment (Earlier Larsco Entertainment), a company based in Hyderabad (Telangana, India). Sirisuns produces Telugu films (under the banner of Ramalakshmi Cine Creations) and content for Television. Sridhar’s wife, Sirisha Lagadapati is the co-founder and partner alongside Sridhar in all aspects of Sirisuns.

Background
Sridhar Lagadapati was the co-founder of Lanco Infratech Ltd., along with his brothers Rajagopal Lagadapati and Madhusudhan Lagadapati.  Lanco is an integrated infrastructure developer with interests in Power, Infrastructure, Construction and Property Development. After Sridhar founded Sirisuns (then Larsco Entertainment) in 2003, he gradually shifted his focus from Lanco Infratech (where he was then the Vice Chairman of the group) to Sirisuns Entertainment and made his first film in Telugu, "Evadi Gola Vaadidhii". Today, he is still a key executive and promoter of Lanco Infratech and continues in the capacity of Director in several of Lanco Infratech’s group companies.

Biography
Sridhar Lagadapati was born in Nellore, Andhra Pradesh (AP)- the youngest sibling among Padma Garlapati the eldest, Rajagopal and Madhusudhan, the youngest but one. His mother Rama Lakshmamma and father Rama Naidu sent him to Vijayawada for his intermediate education at Siddarth Arts College, after he finished his secondary school education from Loyola Public School, Guntur. For his Engineering degree, Sridhar went to Tumkur, Karnataka where he studied at the Siddaganga Institute of Technology. His pursuit of higher education landed in him the US, where he took a Masters in Construction Management from Eastern Michigan University (EMU).

After his return from the USA, Sridhar married Sirisha in 1995. Around this time Sridhar was also appointed Joint Managing Director of Lanco Infratech Limited (formerly Lanco Constructions). Subsequently, Sridhar took lead of the company as its Managing Director and then, as its Vice-Chairman. By 2003, he set up Sirisuns Entertainment along with Sirisha. He lives in Jubilee Hills at Hyderabad with his wife Sirisha and their two sons Prashant Gaurav and Sahidev Vikram.

Other activities
 
Sridhar is a trustee of Lanco Foundation (Earlier called LIGHT - Lanco Institute of General & Humanitarian Trust), and is the Managing Trustee of Sri Prasahi Charities, a personal charity founded by Sridhar and Sirisha.

Sirisuns Entertainment
Sridhar set up Sirisuns Entertainment (Earlier, Larsco Entertainment) with Sirisha in 2003, focusing on contemporary and progressive cinema. It produces movies under the banner of Ramalakshmi Cine Creations with the logo of Mother and Child. Sridhar explains that the logo epitomizes the cinematic contentment that Sirisuns likes to give to its audience through its audio-visual products. Today, Sirisuns is considered a successful production house in the Telugu film industry with movies such as Style and Evadi Gola Vaadidi.

Filmography
 Evadi Gola Vaadidhi (2005, Telugu)
 Style (2006 film) (2006, Telugu)
 Latchiyam (2006, Tamil) - Dubbed version of Style
 Viyyalavari Kayyalu (2007, Telugu)
 Sneha Geetham (2010, Telugu)
 Potugadu (2013, Telugu)
 Sikandar (2014, Dubbed in Telugu from Tamil movie Anjaan) Co-produced with Thiruppati Brothers and UTV Motion Pictures
 Krishnamma Kalipindi Iddarini (Telugu, 2015)
 Naa Peru Surya (Telugu, 2018)
 Jhoomo Nacho Gao Yaron (Hindi, 2018) - Style (2006) dubbed into Hindi
 Evadu Thakkuva Kaadu (Telugu, 2019)

Critical Reception and Awards

Krishnamma Kalipindi Iddarini (2015): Won Best Romantic Film Award at Jaipur International Film Festival, 2016

Snehageetham (2010): Won AP State Nandi Award for Best Female Playback singer to Pranavi for the song "Sarigama-padani" from this film

References 

1968 births
People from Nellore
Living people
Television personalities from Andhra Pradesh
Businesspeople from Andhra Pradesh